Chapter 22 may refer to:

 A company filing for Chapter 11 bankruptcy for a second time
 "Chapter 22", an episode of House of Cards
 "Chapter 22", an episode of Legion